Guy Thauvette (born March 19, 1944) is a Canadian actor from Pointe-des-Cascades, Quebec. He is most noted for his performance in the film Infiltration (Le problème d'infiltration), for which he was a Prix Iris nominee for Best Supporting Actor at the 20th Quebec Cinema Awards in 2018, as well as his performance as Gen. Roméo Dallaire in the film A Sunday in Kigali (Une dimanche à Kigali).

Filmography

References

External links

1944 births
Living people
20th-century Canadian male actors
21st-century Canadian male actors
Canadian male film actors
Canadian male television actors
Male actors from Quebec
People from Montérégie
French Quebecers